Love Wins Again is an album by Janiva Magness. It earned Magness a Grammy Award nomination for Best Contemporary Blues Album.

References

2016 albums
Blues albums by American artists